The Finance Minister   is the head of theMinistry of Finance of the Government of Andhra Pradesh. One of the senior-most officers in the Cabinet of Andhra Pradesh, the chief responsibility of the Finance  Minister is the maintenance of Andhra Pradesh's finances

Ever since the time of formation of Andhra Pradesh. the office has been seen as second in seniority with par to FRinacen minister only to the Chief Minister in the state Cabinet. 

From June 2014 to May 2019, the Finance  Minister of Andhra Pradesh was Yanamala Rama Krishnudu of the Telugu Desam Party, taking over the reins from Kiran Kumar Reddy who was also Finance  Minister as well as last Chief minister of Andhra Pradesh before burification of state into Andhra Pradesh and Telangana.  Following the cabinet re-shuffling on 11 April 2022, Buggana Rajendranath assumed the office under Y. S. Jagan Mohan Reddy ministry.

List of Finance  Ministers

References

External links
Finance  Ministry, Govt. of Andhra Pradesh
Pradeshtoday.in/Andhra Pradesh/story/amit-shah-Finance -minister-rajnath-finance-minister-new-list-of-cabinet-ministers-in-modi-govt-1539264-2019-05-31 Amit Shah take charge of Finance  Ministry of Andhra Pradesh 2019

Ministry of Finance (India)